The 1894 Liège–Bastogne–Liège was the third edition of the Liège–Bastogne–Liège cycle race and was held on 26 August 1894. The race started and finished in Liège. The race was won by Léon Houa.

General classification

References

1894
1894 in Belgian sport